Georges Haupt (January 18 , 1928–1978) was a historian of socialism.

Further reading 

 
 
 
 
 
 
 
 
 
 
 
 

1928 births
1978 deaths
Historians of socialism